The Cinema Camera is a line of digital movie cameras developed and manufactured by Blackmagic Design, introduced on September 4, 2012. They are a series of small form-factor cinema cameras that shoot in either 6k, 4K, 2.5K, and 1080p resolution, and thus are more versatile when compared to standard-resolution digital movie cameras.

Models 
 Cinema Camera 2.5K (2012)
 Pocket Cinema Camera (2013)
 Production Camera 4K (2014)
 Micro Cinema Camera (2016)
 Pocket Cinema Camera 4K (2018)
 Pocket Cinema Camera 6K (2018)
 Pocket Cinema Camera 6K Pro (2021)
 Pocket Cinema Camera 6K G2 (2022)

Features

Formats 
All cameras use at least the RAW, Blackmagic RAW (BRAW), CinemaDNG, Apple ProRes and/or Avid DNxHD codecs and formats in either 8K, 6K, 4K, 2.5K or 1080p.

Software 
All of the cameras uses Blackmagic's proprietary Camera Utility software, in which all need to be connected to a computer via USB to install the firmware and are obtained through Blackmagic's Support Center.

References 

Products introduced in 2012
Digital movie cameras